Kuchash (Küsäş) is a rural locality (a selo) in Novokilbakhtinsky Selsoviet, Kaltasinsky District, Bashkortostan, Russia. The population was 252 as of 2010. There are 13 streets.

Geography 
Kuchash is located 34 km east of Kaltasy (the district's administrative centre) by road. Aktuganovo is the nearest rural locality.

References 

Rural localities in Kaltasinsky District